Heli-Expo is the largest helicopter exhibition in the world. It is organized by the Helicopter Association International. In 2013, it attracted 20,393 visitors from all over the world. It is one of the largest gatherings of the industry it is often the place where innovations are introduced.

Both new and older model helicopters are on display at the show, as well as parts, accessories, upgrade kits, and information about services.

In 2016 Heli-Expo was held in Louisville, Kentucky for the first time.

References

External links
  

Aviation in the United States
Aviation exhibitions
Exhibitions in the United States
Trade shows in the United States